Chris or Christopher Brooks may refer to:

 Chris Brooks (American football) (born 1987), American football wide receiver
 Chris Brooks (guitarist) (born 1974), Australian guitarist
 Chris Brooks (gymnast) (born 1986), American gymnast
 Chris Brooks (ice hockey) (born 1972), Canadian ice hockey player and coach
 Chris Brooks, Canadian doctor, founder of Lifeline Malawi
 Chris Brooks Foster, fictional character from the American TV show, The Young and the Restless
 Chris Brooks (politician) (born 1972), American politician
 Chris Brooks (academic), professor of finance
 Chris Brooks, lead guitarist of American alternative rock band Black Suit Youth
 Chris Brooks, lead singer of the New Zealand rock band Like a Storm
 Christopher Eugene Brooks (1972–2016), American murderer